This is an alphabetical list of articles pertaining specifically to structural engineering. For a broad overview of engineering, please see List of engineering topics. For biographies please see List of engineers.

A
A-frame –
Aerodynamics –
Aeroelasticity –
Air-supported structure –
Airframe –
Aluminium –
Analytical method –
Angular frequency –
Angular speed –
Architecture –
Architectural engineering –
Arch –
Arch bridge

B
Base isolation –
Beam –
Beam axle –
Bending –
Bifurcation theory –
Biomechanics –
Boat Building –
Body-on-frame –
Box girder bridge –
Box truss –
Bridge engineering –
Buckling –
Building –
Building construction –
Building engineering

C
Cable –
Cable-stayed bridge –
Cantilever –
Cantilever bridge –
Carbon-fiber-reinforced polymer –
Casing –
Casting –
Catastrophic failure –
Center of mass –
Chaos theory –
Chassis –
Chimneys –
Coachwork –
Coefficient of thermal expansion –
Coil spring –
Columns –
Composite material –
Composite structure –
Compression –
Compressive stress –
Concrete –
Concrete cover –
Construction –
Construction engineering –
Construction management –
Continuum mechanics –
Corrosion –
Crane –
Creep –
Crumple zone –
Curvature

D
Dam –
Damper –
Damping ratio –
Dead and live loads –
Deflection –
Deformation –
Direct stiffness method –
Dome –
Double wishbone suspension –
Duhamel's integral –
Dynamical system –
Dynamics

E
Earthquake--
Earthquake engineering –
Earthquake engineering research –
Earthquake engineering structures –
Earthquake loss –
Earthquake performance evaluation –
Earthquake simulation –
Elasticity theory –
Elasticity –
Energy principles in structural mechanics –
Engineering mechanics –
Euler method –
Euler–Bernoulli beam equation

F
Falsework –
Fatigue –
Fibre reinforced plastic –
Finite element analysis –
Finite element method –
Finite element method in structural mechanics –
Fire safety –
Fire protection –
Fire protection engineering –
First moment of area –
Flexibility method –
Floating raft system –
Floor –
Fluid mechanics –
Footbridges –
Force –
Formwork –
Foundation engineering –
Fracture –
Fracture mechanics –
Frame –
Frequency –
Fuselage

G
Girder –
Grout

H
Hoist –
Hollow structural section –
Hooke's law –
Hull –
Hurricane-proof building –
Hyperboloid structure

I
Institution of Structural Engineers

J
Joint

K

L
Lattice tower –
Lever –
Leaf spring –
Limit state design –
Linear elasticity –
Linear system –
Linkage –
Live axle –
Load –
Load factor

M
MacPherson strut –
Masonry –
Mast –
Material science –
Modulus of elasticity –
Mohr-Coulomb theory –
Monocoque –
Moment –
Moment distribution –
Moment of inertia –
Mortar –
Moulding

N
Newton method –
Newtonian mechanics –
Non-linear system –
Numerical analysis -
Non-persistent joint

O
Offshore engineering –
Oscillation

P
Permissible stress design –
Pile –
Plastic analysis –
Plastic bending –
plasticity –
Poisson's ratio –
Portland cement –
Portal frame –
Precast concrete –
Prestressed concrete –
Pressure vessel

Q

R
Radius of gyration –
Ready-mix concrete –
Rebar –
Reinforced concrete –
Response spectrum –
Retaining wall –
Rigid frame –
Rotation

S
Second moment of area –
Seismic analysis –
Seismic loading –
Seismic performance –
Seismic retrofit –
Seismic risk –
Shear –
Shear flow –
Shear modulus –
Shear strain –
Shear strength –
Shear stress –
Shear wall –
Shipbuilding –
Ship Construction –
Shock absorbers –
Shotcrete –
Shrinkage –
Simple machine –
Skyscraper –
Slab –
Solid mechanics –
Space frame –
Statics –
Statically determinate –
Statically indeterminate –
Statistical method –
Steel –
Stiffness –
Strand jack –
Strength of materials –
Stress analysis –
Stress-strain curve –
Strut –
Strut bar –
Structural analysis –
Structural design –
Structural dynamics –
Structural failure –
Structural health monitoring –
Structural load –
Structural mechanics –
Structural steel –
Structural system –
Subframe –
Superleggera –
Suspension (disambiguation page) –
Suspension bridge

T
Tall building –
Tensile architecture –
Tensile strength –
Tensile stress –
Tensile structure –
Tension –
Timber –
Timber framing –
Thermal conductivity –
Thermal shock –
Thermodynamics –
Thermoplastic –
Truss –
Truss bridge –
Torsion –
Torsion beam suspension –
Torsion box –
Tower –
Tubular bridge –
Tuned mass damper

U
Unit dummy force method –
Unsprung weight

V
Vehicle dynamics –
Vessel –
Very large floating structures –
Vibration –
Vibration control –
Virtual work

W
Wall –
Wear –
Wedge –
Welding –
Wheel and axle

X

Y
Yield strength –
Young's modulus

Z

Structural engineering
Structural engineering
Structural engineering topics